Xichong County is a county in the northeast of Sichuan Province, China. It is under the administration of the prefecture-level city of Nanchong.

Historical Evolution 
During the Republic of China (1912-1949), the establishment of Xichong County was the same as the time of the Qing dynasty. In 1914, North Sichuan Road was changed to Jialing Road, and Xichong County was under the jurisdiction of Jialing Road. In 1935, the road was abandoned and changed to the 11th Administrative Inspectorate District of Sichuan Province.

After the Chinese Civil War concluded, and the People's Republic of China was founded, the North Sichuan Administrative office was established, and Xichong came under the jurisdiction of the Nanchong Special District.

Population 
As of 2014, the population is 650,000, down from 658,000 in 2013.

The population density of Xichong is approximately 590 people per kilometre squared, based on population figures from 2014.

Climate 
Much like most of the Eastern half of Sichuang, Xichong experiences a humid subtropical climate.

References

County-level divisions of Sichuan
Nanchong